The 1971 Tour de Suisse was the 35th edition of the Tour de Suisse cycle race and was held from 11 June to 18 June 1971. The race started in Zürich and finished in Olten. The race was won by Georges Pintens of the Hertekamp team.

General classification

References

1971
Tour de Suisse
June 1971 sports events in Europe